Sous le signe du lion is a Quebec television series comprising thirty 30-minute episodes, directed by Jean-Pierre Sénécal and broadcast in 1961. A two-season remake (thirteen 60-minute episodes each season) was broadcast in 1997 and in 2000. The original screenplay was written by Françoise Loranger. Hélène Pedneault adapted it in 1997 and Guy Fournier in 2000. The 1997 adaptation was directed by Maude Martin, and the 2000 by Yvon Trudel.

Faced with the daring and modern script, Radio-Canada refused to broadcast it at first, but changed its mind a few years later.

Synopsis 
The story revolves around rich and powerful Jérémie Martin, the father in a family which fears and scorns him. It begins after the death of his wife Clothilde, who is euthanized by Jérémie's mistress and the family maid, Annette. The plot unfolds around Clothilde's locket, on which is engraved "Qui suis-je?" (Who am I?), and her diary, to which Jérémie has no access.

In the second season of the remake, Jérémie is paralyzed after a heart attack. He loses his hold on the family, which further worsens his health.

Cast

Original version 

 Juliette Béliveau: Marie-Rose Julien
 Rita Bibeau: shop employee
 Charlotte Boisjoli: Annette Julien
 Monique Champagne: Céline Martin
 Colette Courtois: stenographer
 Jean Coutu: Beaujeu Martin
 Jean Dalmain: Dr. Rondeau
 Bertrand Gagnon: Master Pelletier
 Roger Garceau: Notary Public Beauchemin
 François Guillier: Michel Martin
 Paul Hébert: Gabriel Mercier
 Jacques Kasma: René
 Madeleine Langlois: Céline Martin
 François Lavigne: Trudeau
 Ovila Légaré: Jérémie Martin
 Yves Létourneau: Laurent Martin
 Michel Mailhot: Jean-Marie Mounier
 Monique Mercure: Simone
 Jean-Louis Millette: a client of Beaujeu's
 Dyne Mousso: Martine Julien
 Jean-Louis Paris: Albert Julien
 Claude Préfontaine: Philippe Beaujeu
 Denise Provost: Clothilde Martin
 Rose Rey-Duzil: Maria
 Claire Richard: Carmelle
 François Tassé (actor): Maurice
 Véronique Vilbert: Beaujeu's secretary

Remake 

 Jean Besré: Notary Public Beauchemin
 Eric Cabana: Maurice
 Anne-Marie Cadieux: Simone
 Margot Campbell: Céline
 Corinne Chevarier: Carmelle
 Suzanne Clément: Martine Julien
 Jean Deschênes: Jérémie's father
 Pierre Drolet: doctor
 Jacques Godin: Jérémie Martin
 James P. Hyndman: Jean-Marie Mounier
 Pierre Légaré: Pelletier
 Sylvie Legault: Céline Martin
 Roger Léger: Laurent Martin
 Jacques Lussier: Beaujeu Martin
 Alexis Martin: Philippe Beaujeu
 Marie-Claude Michaud: Geneviève
 Nathalie Naubert: Clothilde Beaujeu
 Huguette Oligny: Marie-Rose Julien
 Denys Paris: René
 Claude Préfontaine: Dr. Rondeau
 Claude Prégent: Albert Julien
 Danielle Proulx: Annette Julien
 Denis Roy: Gabriel Mercier
 Gabriel Sabourin: Michel Martin
 Lenie Scoffié: Maria
 Gisèle Trépanier: Antonia

See also 

 List of French-language Canadian television series

Awards 

 Prix Gémeaux for best series in 1998

Ici Radio-Canada Télé original programming
Prix Gémeaux-winning shows
1960s Canadian drama television series